Nova Aurora may refer to two municipalities in Brazil:

Nova Aurora, Goiás
Nova Aurora, Paraná